The Six Pillars of Self-Esteem is a psychology book written by Dr. Nathaniel Branden. The book describes what Branden believes are the key elements that raise or lower the self-esteem of an individual.

The Six Pillars are:
 The Practice of Living Consciously
 The Practice of Self-Acceptance
 The Practice of Self-Responsibility
 The Practice of Self-Assertiveness
 The Practice of Living Purposefully
 The Practice of Personal Integrity

References 

1994 non-fiction books
Books by Nathaniel Branden
Psychology books